Almamy Sogoba (born 13 September 1987) is a Malian football goalkeeper.

He played for Djoliba AC until 2008. He then moved to AS Real Bamako, where he became club captain, and won the Malian Cup in 2010.

References

1987 births
Living people
Malian footballers
Association football goalkeepers
2012 Africa Cup of Nations players
21st-century Malian people